Patriarch of Ethiopia may refer to :

 the Catholic former Latin Patriarch of Ethiopia (1555-1663)
 the Orthodox Patriarch-Catholicos of Axum